Majid Namjoo-Motlagh (born May 31, 1966 in Tehran, Iran) is a former Iranian football player and now manager.

Playing career

International career
Namjoo-Moltagh debuted for the Iran national football team on May 28, 1986 in a friendly match against China in Beijing. He made 45 appearances for Iran from 1986 to 1997. In August 2015, he played for Iranian All-Star team against World All-Star and got rejected when asking to exchange his jersey with one of the all-star players.

Managerial career
Namjoo-Motlagh signed as head-coach of newly formed Shahrdari Bandar Abbas in August 2006. Near the end of the season he was replaced by former Mes Kerman head coach, Nader Dastneshan.

Career statistics

International goals

Honours

Club
Esteghlal
Asian Club Championship (1): 1990-91
Iranian Football League (1): 1989-90
Tehran Province League (2): 1985-86, 1991–92

Persepolis
Iranian Football League (2): 1995-96, 1996-97

National
Iran
Asian Games Gold Medal (1): 1990

References

External links

Iranian footballers
Iran international footballers
Association football midfielders
Esteghlal F.C. players
Pas players
Iranian expatriate footballers
Persepolis F.C. players
keshavarz players
Singapore Premier League players
Iranian football managers
People from Tehran
1967 births
Living people
Balestier Khalsa FC players
Al Sadd SC players
1988 AFC Asian Cup players
Asian Games gold medalists for Iran
Asian Games medalists in football
Footballers at the 1986 Asian Games
Footballers at the 1990 Asian Games
Expatriate footballers in Singapore
Qatar Stars League players
Medalists at the 1990 Asian Games
Aluminium Hormozgan F.C. managers
Gol Gohar Sirjan F.C. managers
20th-century Iranian people